The following radio stations broadcast on AM frequency 1060 kHz: 1060 AM is a United States and Mexican clear-channel frequency.  KYW Philadelphia and XEEP Mexico City share Class A status on 1060 kHz.

Canada
 CKMX in Calgary, Alberta - 50 kW, transmitter located at

Cuba
 CMGW - Radio 26 in Matanzas.

Guatemala (Channel 53)
TGXA in Guatemala

Mexico
Stations in bold are clear-channel stations.
 XEEP in Mexico City (Ejército de Oriente, District Federal) - 100 kW daytime, 20 kW nighttime, transmitter located at 
 XERDO-AM in Brecha 73, Tamaulipas

United States
Stations in bold are clear-channel stations.

References 

Lists of radio stations by frequency